Oh Dad, Poor Dad, Mamma's Hung You in the Closet and I'm Feelin' So Sad is a 1967 American black comedy film directed by Richard Quine, based on the 1962 play Oh Dad, Poor Dad, Mamma's Hung You in the Closet and I'm Feelin' So Sad: A Pseudoclassical Tragifarce in a Bastard French Tradition by Arthur L. Kopit. The screenplay was written by Ian Bernard. The film stars Rosalind Russell, Robert Morse and Barbara Harris; Harris was the only main cast member who had also appeared in the original, Off-Broadway production of the play.

Plot
Described by Kopit as a "farce in three scenes", the story involves an overbearing mother who travels to a luxury resort in the Caribbean, bringing along her son and her deceased husband, preserved and in his casket.

Cast

Production
Filming was completed by July 1965.  However it was decided to re-edit the movie entirely and add new scenes after previews. New scenes were directed by Alexander Mackendrick. An entirely new music score was added too.

References

External links

1967 films
1960s black comedy films
American black comedy films
American films based on plays
Films directed by Richard Quine
Films scored by Neal Hefti
Films set in the Caribbean
Films set on islands
Paramount Pictures films
1967 comedy films
1967 drama films
1960s English-language films
1960s American films